Vladimir Adolfovich Ilyin (born 16 November 1947) is a Soviet and Russian actor. He was awarded  People's Artist of Russia in 1999.

Early life
Vladimir Ilyin was born in Sverdlovsk, Russian SFSR, Soviet Union (now Yekaterinburg, Russia). In 1969 he graduated from the Sverdlovsk Theatre School (course F. Grigoryan). He worked in the theater "Buffoon" under the direction of G. Yudenich in Kazan Youth Theater. From 1974 to 1989 he worked in the theater named after Vl. Mayakovsky led by A. Goncharov.

Personal life
Wife Zoe Ilyina (née Pylnova), Short voice.

Nephew - Aleksandr Ilyin, Jr. Russian actor.

Selected filmography
Vladimir Ilyin has starred in over 111 films

References

External links
 

Living people
1947 births
Actors from Yekaterinburg
Soviet male film actors
Russian male film actors
20th-century Russian male actors
21st-century Russian male actors
Recipients of the Nika Award
People's Artists of Russia
State Prize of the Russian Federation laureates